Martin Stewart Eichenbaum (born August 23, 1954) is the Charles Moskos professor of economics at Northwestern University, and the co-director of the Center for International Economics and Development. His research focuses on macroeconomics, international economics, and monetary theory and policy.

Biography
After graduating from McGill University (B.Comm. in Economics, 1976) and the University of Minnesota (Ph.D. Economics, 1981) he served as an assistant professor at Carnegie Mellon University before moving to Northwestern University in 1988. He is currently the Charles Moskos professor of Economics at Northwestern University and in addition the co-director of the Center for International Economics and Development there. During his career he also taught at Carnegie Mellon University, the University of Chicago, and the University of Pennsylvania. In addition, he has been a consultant to the Federal Reserve Banks of Chicago, Atlanta, and San Francisco as well as the International Monetary Fund.

Eichenbaum is married to Yona and has two children.

Contributions
Eichenbaums's research focuses on macroeconomics, international economics, and monetary theory and policy. Specifically, he has been concerned with understanding aggregate economic fluctuations, studying the causes and consequences of exchange rate fluctuations, as well as the effect of monetary policy on
postwar United States business cycles.

Selected papers

Associations
Eichenbaum was elected a Fellow of the American Academy of Arts and Sciences in 2013. He was elected a Fellow of the Royal Society of Canada in 2021. He is a fellow of the Econometric Society and a research associate at the National Bureau of Economic Research. He served as the co-editor of the American Economic Review from 2011 to 2015. He is now the co-editor of the NBER Macro Annual. In addition, he is on the Board of Directors of the Bank of Montreal.

In 2019, Eichenbaum became MAS Term professor at the National University of Singapore.

References

External links

Martin Eichenbaum's homepage at Northwestern University
The Center for International Macroeconomics
Links to articles, REPEC

1954 births
Living people
Macroeconomists
Econometricians
University of Minnesota College of Liberal Arts alumni
McGill University alumni
Carnegie Mellon University faculty
University of Chicago Booth School of Business faculty
University of Pennsylvania faculty
Northwestern University faculty
Academic staff of the National University of Singapore
International Monetary Fund people
Fellows of the Econometric Society
Fellows of the American Academy of Arts and Sciences
21st-century American economists